"Dime Que Me Quieres" is the second single from the album Me Gusta Todo de Ti by Banda El Recodo.

Music video
The music video starts by showing a woman in a bikini. Then the main singer of the band applies for a job as a pool boy. He also writes a letter to the woman in the bikini. The band is also playing in a different part of the house. The singer is a waiter at a restaurant where he is well known. He is shown walking and singing in an alley. The other pool boy gives her the letter written by the singer. As the woman reads the letter written for her, she looks displeased and worried. There is another man that wants the woman and the father approves of this. The singer is seen walking to the woman's house but is disappointed to see the woman with the other man. He leaves and walks down the same alley, where he was before, when a car pulls up and friends greet him and he gets in. The song ends, but shows that it is to be continued.

Tito El Bambino has a cameo in this music video and is also a friend to the singer.

Charts

Weekly charts

Year-end charts

Decade-end charts

References

2009 singles
2009 songs
Fonovisa Records singles
Banda el Recodo songs